Luanne Maurice (born 3 August 1972) is a Mauritian swimmer. She competed in the women's 4 × 100 metre freestyle relay event at the 1992 Summer Olympics.

References

External links
 

1972 births
Living people
Mauritian female swimmers
Olympic swimmers of Mauritius
Swimmers at the 1992 Summer Olympics
Place of birth missing (living people)
Mauritian female freestyle swimmers